Sir Arthur Conan Doyle's Sherlock Holmes, also known simply as Sherlock Holmes, is a 2010 British-American steampunk mystery film directed by Rachel Lee Goldenberg and produced by independent American film studio The Asylum. It features the Sherlock Holmes characters created by Sir Arthur Conan Doyle, though it follows an original plot. The film details an unrecorded case in which eccentric detective Holmes and his companion Dr. Watson investigate a series of unusual monster attacks and a plot to destroy London. Gareth David-Lloyd plays Dr. John Watson and Ben Syder, making his film debut, plays Sherlock Holmes.

The film is a direct-to-DVD mockbuster intended to capitalize upon the similarly-titled Warner Brothers film directed by Guy Ritchie, and is the second film by The Asylum to be inspired by the writings of Arthur Conan Doyle, the first being King of the Lost World. The film was shot primarily in Caernarfon, Wales on a low budget. The Asylum had previously used the same locations to film Merlin and the War of the Dragons. Syfy have since acquired the television rights of the film.

Plot
On December 29, 1940, during the London Blitz, an elderly Dr. John Watson tells his nurse the tale of an unrecorded case he shared with his friend Sherlock Holmes. On May 19, 1882, a royal treasury ship is destroyed by a monstrous giant octopus on the coast of Newhaven. Holmes and Watson investigate the shipwreck and do not believe the first-hand accounts of the sole survivor of the attack, but nonetheless investigate. Inspector Lestrade states that he has recently had contact with Holmes's estranged brother Thorpe, a former partner of Lestrade's who was paralyzed during a bank robbery seven years prior.

In Whitechapel, a young man is killed by a dinosaur. Watson is skeptical until he and Holmes discover the creature on their morning constitutional. Finding escape, several more clues lead Holmes to deduce that the monsters are artificial, built by a criminal genius to acquire resources. On the case, the dinosaur steals a water pump operating a fountain and rolls of copper wire, presumably so Spring-Heeled Jack can create another monster. The octopus that destroyed the ship earlier is linked to the dinosaur because they are both similarly "exceptionally improbable". Lestrade accompanies Holmes and Watson during their investigation. On one of their leads, Lestrade ends up missing. Holmes's reasoning leads himself and Watson to an old castle in Helmsmouth he and his brother visited as children. They come across another monster, a masked mechanical man: Spring-Heeled Jack.

Spring-Heeled Jack is revealed to be Holmes' brother, Thorpe, who also assumed the identity of a patient of Watson's. Inesidora Ivory, his accomplice, is with him. Thorpe explains that he built a mechanical suit to cure his paralysis, and he deduced that the crippling bullet ricocheted off a doorframe, fired by Lestrade. He plans to destroy London, assassinate Queen Victoria and force Lestrade to claim responsibility. Ivory is revealed to be one of Thorpe's creations and his lover, and she carries a bomb in her workings that will detonate when she reaches Buckingham Palace, while Thorpe pilots his most complex invention yet, a fire-breathing dragon in which he pilots and holds Lestrade hostage. Watson is sent to stop Ivory from killing the Queen, while Holmes pilots another one of Thorpe's flying inventions in an attempt to stop his brother.

Thorpe's dragon sets fire to Parliament and Westminster Abbey. Ivory is deactivated by Watson moments before the explosion can take place and the dragon is sent crashing in the garden outside the Palace. Thorpe, crippled again, crawls from the wreckage and tries to shoot Watson, before he himself is shot by Sherlock Holmes. Holmes proves Lestrade was not responsible for Thorpe's crippling. Lestrade takes credit for saving the Queen and Holmes and Watson vow never to speak of the events again. In present time, Watson expires peacefully and his nurse visits his grave. Nearby, Ivory is visiting the grave of Thorpe Holmes.

Cast
 Ben Syder as Sherlock Holmes; an eccentric, unofficial consulting detective. This was Syder's film debut.
 Gareth David-Lloyd as Dr. John Watson; Holmes's flatmate, physician and biographer and a veteran of the Second Afghan War.
 David Shackleton as Old Watson
 Dominic Keating as Inspector Thorpe Holmes/"Spring-heeled Jack"; A former police inspector and estranged brother of Sherlock Holmes.
 William Huw as Inspector Lestrade; A Scotland Yard inspector and frequent accomplice of Sherlock Holmes.
 Elizabeth Arends as Anesidora Ivory; Spring-Heeled Jack's assistant.
 Catriona McDonald as Mrs. Hudson; Sherlock Holmes's housekeeper.
 Rachael Evelyn as Miss Lucy Hudson; Old Watson's nurse. 
 Neil Williams as Phineas Stiles
 Dylan Jones as Grolton
 Chris Coxon as John Poole
 Katie Thomas as Sally Fassbinder/"Miss Pinchcock"
 Iago Patrick McGuire as Lees

Release
Sherlock Holmes was released on DVD on January 26, 2010, a month after the similarly-titled Guy Ritchie film. The DVD features the full-length film and extras like a making-of feature called Exile on Baker Street: A Behind-the-scenes look at Sherlock Holmes, the official trailer and bloopers from filming. Syfy broadcasts the film under the full title Sir Arthur Conan Doyle's Sherlock Holmes.

Reception
Sherlock Holmes was met with skepticism immediately upon its announcement. Scott Foy of Dread Central criticized the plot synopsis, which indicated that Holmes would be facing "enormous monsters" attacking London. Foy said, "Sherlock Holmes, monster slayer. Who wants another snooty Sherlock Holmes mystery when you can have him and Dr. Watson make like Buffy and Angel? Maybe they can take it a step further and have Holmes' cocaine habit affect him in much the same way as Popeye's spinach."

In his book Sherlock Holmes On Screen: The Complete Film and TV History, Alan Barnes said that while Keating and David-Lloyd "acquit themselves with a little dignity," he described Ben Syder's Holmes as "punchable" and called the overall film "dismal," "cheap and cheerless," and criticized the "risible final act" in particular. He concluded by saying that "listing the production's many deficiencies would be an entirely pointless exercise."

Steve Anderson of Screenhead.com gave the film a rating of 6 out of 10, calling it "one of The Asylum's better movies", concluding that it's "far fetched" and "utterly mad" but claiming that it has a "spark of entertainment to it."  Freddie Young of Fangoria called Sherlock Holmes "probably the best Asylum film to date" but recommended it only to those "willing to check reality at the door and just enjoy the silly ride." Jay Seaver of eFilmCritic called the film "kind of fun" but "disappointing," criticizing Syder's Holmes in particular, concluding that "a better Holmes would have allowed this movie to more squarely hit the mark." Admitting that Asylum's films are "so bad they’re good", Kristina Manente of SyFy called the film Sherlock Holmes vs. Dinosaurs and said it was "everything you want in a parody".

References

External links
 Sherlock Holmes at The Asylum
 

2010 direct-to-video films
2010 films
2010 independent films
The Asylum films
British mystery drama films
Mockbuster films
Films set in London
Battle of Britain films
Films set in 1940
Films set in the 1880s
Films shot in Wales
Sherlock Holmes films
Sherlock Holmes pastiches
Films about dinosaurs
Steampunk films
Films directed by Rachel Lee Goldenberg
2010s English-language films
2010s American films
2010s British films